Gelacio Montiel Fuentes (born 21 November 1961) is a Mexican politician affiliated with the Party of the Democratic Revolution. As of 2014 he served as Deputy of the LIX Legislature of the Mexican Congress representing Tlaxcala.

References

1961 births
Living people
Politicians from Tlaxcala
Party of the Democratic Revolution politicians
20th-century Mexican politicians
21st-century Mexican politicians
Municipal presidents in Tlaxcala
Deputies of the LIX Legislature of Mexico
Members of the Chamber of Deputies (Mexico) for Tlaxcala